Tristan Park was formed in October 1986 by songwriters Brian Coombes, Chuck Dyac, and Marc Larochelle. Early Tristan Park sets included their theatrical/musical production, "The Screams for an Absent Dawn." It was an ambitious and influential beginning for a group of fledgling songwriters.

The band made its Boston area debut in May 1989. Later that same year, Tristan Park released its first cassette, The Space Between, to positive critical response. In October 1989, the Nashua Telegraph hailed the band as "the Nashua area's most literate, ambitious, and talented rock band."

Rick Black joined the band in August 1991, when founder Marc Larochelle relocated to California. Shortly after, the band's long-time friend, Jim Turmel, became Tristan Park's drummer. New England radio stations WHEB, WHOB, WAAF, and WCGY were all playing Tristan Park by the fall of 1991.

The band released "The Way it Should Be"/"Mourning of Spring" as a cassette single in August 1992. Sales were brisk and reviews positive. The band continued to perform constantly, building a loyal regional following throughout New Hampshire.

Tristan Park's debut disc, At the End of the Day, appeared in January 1994. Blending progressive-rock with lyrical AOR, the disc was the progressive rock community's introduction to Tristan Park. Singer Ray Bowles joined the band in August 1994.

On the strength of at the End of the Day, Tristan Park signed to Cyclops Records/GFT Limited of England in January 1995. The band's first disc for Cyclops, A Place Inside, was released in August 1995. The material on A Place Inside expanded on the progressive themes of at the End of the Day, while still maintaining an emphasis on melody and emotion. The disc received international attention and was added to radio playlists in Europe and North America. Guitarist Mike McAdam joined Tristan Park in August 1995.

Tristan Park celebrated its Ten Year Anniversary in 1996 with an appearance at the International Festival of Progressive Music (ProgDay) in Chapel Hill, NC in August and its first European tour in October. The band joined Cyclops labelmates Grey Lady Down for successful dates in England and the Netherlands before returning to play the US in November. The year closed with an impressive showing for Tristan Park in the Wondrous Stories (UK) year end Reader's Poll, with the band finishing fourth in the Best New Band Category and sixth in Best CRS Gig, ahead of perennial CRS favorites Grey Lady Down, John Wetton, and Rick Wakeman.

A live disc recorded during the tour, Leave to Enter, was released in August 1997. The disc includes a guest appearance from GLD vocalist Martin Wilson, who joins Tristan Park on the Pink Floyd classic, "Comfortably Numb." In September, Tristan Park performed at the Somerville Theatre as special guests to British rock legends Marillion.

Tristan Park released Looking Homeward in 1998. The band toured Europe in September of that year to promote the disc before going into hiatus at the end of 1998. Coombes, McAdam, and Turmel formed a new group, Waking in the Blue, who released Isn't It Pretty to Think So in July 2003. The disc, distributed in the United States by Griffin Music, featured guest performances by Tristan Park singer Ray Bowles, progressive rock legend Ian Mcdonald, and Squeeze singer-songwriter Chris Difford.

In October 2006, the members of Tristan Park reunited for a 20th anniversary concert at the Tupelo Music Hall in Londonderry, New Hampshire. The reunited line-up included Rick Black, Ray Bowles, Brian Coombes, Chuck Dyac, Marc Larochelle, Mike McAdam, and Jim Turmel.

Brian Coombes went on to open Rocking Horse Studio along with David Pierog. Coombes works currently as a producer, and recording engineer for the facility, with artists such as Christian Cuff, Will Kindler, Joe Mazzari, Prospect Hill, The Lucid, The Double Yellow, and Godsmack guitarist Tony Rombola.

Personnel

Current members
Rick Black – keyboards and backing vocals (1991–present)
Ray Bowles – Vocals and percussion (1993–present)
Brian Coombes – Bass, keyboards and Vocals (1986–present)
Chuck Dyac – Vocals (1986–present)
Mike McAdam – Guitars and backing vocals (1995–present)
Jim Turmel – Drums, percussion and backing vocals (1991–present)
Marc Larochelle keyboards and saxophones (1986–1991; 2006–present)

Former members
 George Taylor (Drums) (1989–1992)
 Julia Spadafora (Badala) (Backup Vocals) (1991–1992)
 Jim Titus (Guitar) (1990)
 Tom Bean (Guitars 1993–1995
 Mike Balevre (Guitar) (1989)

Discography

Studio albums and EPs

Live albums

American progressive rock groups
Musical groups established in 1986